March 30: Land Day (Palestine)
April 5: Children's Day (Palestinian territories)
May 5: Feast of al-Khadr or Saint George (Palestinian communities) 
May 15: Nakba Day (Palestinian communities) 
June 5: Naksa Day (Palestinian communities) 
Movable, generally November 29: International Day of Solidarity with the Palestinian People (2018 date: November 29)
December 4: Eid il-Burbara (Israel and Palestine, not an official holiday)

See also
List of Gregorian Islamic observances
List of Gregorian Jewish-related and Israeli holidays
List of observances set by the Islamic calendar 
List of movable Eastern Christian observances
Palestinian-related
Palestinian culture
Gregorian calendar